Bolshoye Selo is the name of several rural localities in Russia:
Bolshoye Selo, Arkhangelsk Oblast, a village in Zachachyevsky Selsoviet of Kholmogorsky District of Arkhangelsk Oblast
Bolshoye Selo, Kaliningrad Oblast, a settlement under the administrative jurisdiction of  the town of district significance of Neman in Nemansky District of Kaliningrad Oblast
Bolshoye Selo, Ryazan Oblast, a selo in Bolsheselsky Rural Okrug of Pronsky District of Ryazan Oblast
Bolshoye Selo, Vologda Oblast, a village in Kadnikovsky Selsoviet of Sokolsky District of Vologda Oblast
Bolshoye Selo, Yaroslavl Oblast, a selo in Bolsheselsky Rural Okrug of Bolsheselsky District of Yaroslavl Oblast